The Cascade Recreation Area was a Provincial Recreation Area in the Hozameen Range of the Cascade Mountains of British Columbia, Canada, located north of and was added to E.C. Manning Provincial Parkin 2010.   It is roughly 11,858 ha. and was created on March 14, 1987.  The recreation area has limited road access and is used by hikers, horse riders, mountain bikers and, in winter, snowmobilers.  The nearest towns are Hope and Princeton.

References

Canadian Cascades
Provincial parks of British Columbia
1987 establishments in British Columbia